Minister for Solidarity and Health is a cabinet position in the Government of France. The health portfolio oversees the health care public services and the health insurance part of the French Social Security. As French ministerial departments are not fixed and depend on the Prime Minister's choice, the Minister sometimes also has one or some of other portfolios among Work, Pensions, Family, the Elderly, Handicapped people and Women's Rights. In that case, he is helped by one or some junior Minister focusing on one part of the portfolio. The current Minister is François Braun.

Ministers of Health
Georges Leredu 16 January 1921 – 15 January 1922
Paul Strauss 15 January 1922 – 29 March 1924
Désiré Ferry 2 March 1930 – 13 December 1930
Henri Queuille 13 December 1930 – 27 January 1931
Camille Blaisot 27 January 1931 –  3 June 1932
Justin Godart 3 June 1932 – 18 December 1932
Charles Daniélou 18 December 1932 – 26 October 1933
Émile Lisbonne 26 October 1933 – 26 November 1933
Alexandre Israël 26 November 1933 – 30 January 1934
Émile Lisbonne 30 January 1934 –  9 February 1934
Louis Marin 9 February 1934 –  8 November 1934
Henri Queuille 8 November 1934 –  1 June 1935
Louis Lafont 1 June 1935 – 24 January 1936
Louis Nicolle 24 January 1936 –  4 June 1936
Henri Sellier 4 June 1936 – 22 June 1937
Marc Rucart 22 June 1937 – 13 March 1938
Fernand Gentin 13 March 1938 – 10 April 1938
Marc Rucart 10 April 1938 – 21 March 1940
Marcel Héraud 21 March 1940 –  5 June 1940
Georges Pernot 5 June 1940 – 16 June 1940
Jean Ybarnegaray 16 June 1940 – 12 July 1940
Jean Ybarnegaray 12 July 1940 –  6 September 1940
Jacques Chevalier 25 February 1941 – 12 August 1941
Serge Huard 12 August 1941 – 18 April 1942
Raymond Grasset 18 April 1942 – 20 August 1944
Jules Abadie(Commissaire) 7 June 1943 –  9 November 1943
François Billoux10 September 1944 – 21 November 1945
Robert Prigent 21 November 1945 – 26 January 1946
Robert Prigent 26 January 1946 – 24 June 1946
Robert Prigent 24 June 1946 – 16 December 1946
René Arthaud 24 June 1946 – 16 December 1946
Pierre Ségelle 16 December 1946 – 22 January 1947
Georges Marrane 22 January 1947 –  4 May 1947
Marcel Roclore 4 May 1947 –  9 May 1947
Robert Prigent 9 May 1947 – 22 October 1947
Germaine Poinso-Chapuis 24 November 1947 – 26 July 1948
Pierre Schneiter 26 July 1948 – 11 August 1951
Paul Ribeyre 11 August 1951 –  8 January 1953
André Boutemy 8 January 1953 –  9 February 1953
Paul Ribeyre 11 February 1953 – 28 June 1953
Paul Coste-Floret 28 June 1953 – 19 June 1954
Louis-Paul Aujoulat 19 June 1954 – 3 September 1954
André Monteil 3 September 1954 – 23 February 1955
Bernard Lafay 23 February 1955 –  1 February 1956
Félix Houphouët-Boigny 6 November 1957 – 14 May 1958
André Maroselli 14 May 1958 –  1 June 1958
Bernard Chenot 7 July 1958 – 24 August 1961
Joseph Fontanet 24 August 1961 – 15 May 1962
Raymond Marcellin 15 May 1962 – 20 June 1969
Robert Boulin 22 June 1969 –  6 July 1972
Jean Foyer 6 July 1972 –  5 April 1973
Michel Poniatowski 5 April 1973 – 27 May 1974
Simone Veil 27 May 1974 – 4 July 1979
Jacques Barrot 4 July 1979 – 21 May 1981
Edmond Hervé 21 May 1981 – 22 June 1981
Jack Ralite 22 June 1981 – 22 March 1983
Michèle Barzach 1986 – 1988
Claude Evin 23 June 1988 – 15 May 1991
Bernard Kouchner 2 April 1992 – 29 March 1993
Simone Veil 29 March 1993 – 18 May 1995 with Philippe Douste-Blazy as junior Minister
Élisabeth Hubert 18 May 1995 –  7 November 1995
Jacques Barrot 7 November 1995 – 4 June 1997 with Hervé Gaymard as junior Minister
Under Lionel Jospin as Prime Minister
As senior Minister :
Martine Aubry 4 June 1997 – 18 October 2000
Élisabeth Guigou 18 October 2000 – 7 May 2002
As junior Minister
Bernard Kouchner 4 June 1997 – 7 July 1999
Dominique Gillot 28 July 1999 – 6 February 2001
Bernard Kouchner 6 February 2001 – 7 May 2002
Jean-François Mattéi 7 May 2002 – 31 March 2004
Philippe Douste-Blazy 31 March 2004 – 2 June 2005
Xavier Bertrand 2 June 2005 – 26 March 2007
Philippe Bas 26 March 2007 – 18 May 2007
Roselyne Bachelot-Narquin 18 May 2007 – August 2010
Nora Berra and Xavier Bertrand August 2010 – May 2012
Marisol Touraine 16 May 2012 – 10 May 2017
Agnès Buzyn 17 May 2017 – 16 February 2020
Olivier Véran 16 February 2020 – 20 May 2022
 Brigitte Bourguignon 20 May 2022 – 4 July 2022
 François Braun 4 July 2022

References

 
Health in France
Health